Crocanthemum is a genus of flowering plants in the family Cistaceae. They are native to both North and South America where they are widespread. The common name frostweed relates to the ice crystals which form from sap exuding from cracks near the base of the stem in the late fall.

Crocanthemum are herbaceous perennials or subshrubs with alternate leaves. With the exception of species in California, they generally produce two types of flowers: showy, yellow chasmogamous (cross-pollinated) produced earlier in the growing season, followed by cleistogamous (self-pollinated) flowers that are smaller and lack petals. All species of Crocanthemum are fire tolerant and are found in open habitats.

Although the genus was first named in 1836 to encompass New World species of Helianthemum, it generally went unrecognized by taxonomists and its species were included in a broad concept of Helianthemum throughout much of the 1800s and 1900s. However, phylogenetic studies in 2004 and 2009 indicated that the New World species of Helianthemum were more closely related to Hudsonia than Old World Helianthemum. This required the resurrection of the genus Crocanthemum in order to maintain monophyly.

Species
 Crocanthemum aldersonii 
 Crocanthemum arenicola 
 Crocanthemum argenteum 
 Crocanthemum bicknellii 
 Crocanthemum brasiliense 
 Crocanthemum canadense 
 Crocanthemum carolinianum 
 Crocanthemum corymbosum 
 Crocanthemum dumosum 
 Crocanthemum georgianum 
 Crocanthemum glomeratum 
 Crocanthemum greenei 
 Crocanthemum nashii 
 Crocanthemum nutans 
 Crocanthemum pringlei 
 Crocanthemum propinquum 
 Crocanthemum rosmarinifolium 
 Crocanthemum scoparium 
 Crocanthemum suffrutescens

References

Cistaceae
Malvales genera